Doblar is a settlement on the right bank of the Soča River in the Municipality of Kanal ob Soči in the Littoral region of Slovenia. The settlement extends along the valley of Doblarec Creek, a tributary of the Soča.

References

External links
Doblar on Geopedia

Populated places in the Municipality of Kanal